Pheona Nabasa Gladys Wall, commonly known as Pheona Wall, is a Ugandan lawyer, Public Relation Officer and serves as the president of  Uganda Law Society since September 2020. She served as a lecturer of Law at Kampala International University.

Early life and educational background
Pheaona Wall was born and raised in Jinja District. She is the first born in a family of three children. Pheona attended YMCA Nursery School Jinja, Narambhai Primary School Jinja, Victoria Nile Primary School Jinja, She completed her O and A'Levels from Mt. St. Mary's College Namagunga on scholarship which was given to her by Uganda Commercial Bank for being the best PLE student in Eastern Region. Pheona Wall studied Bachelor of Laws on a government scholarship and a Master in Management as well a Post Graduate Diploma in Legal Practice from Law Development Centre. She served in different prefectiorial body  such as a time keeper, Sanitary Prefect at Narandbai Primary School and Victoria Nile Primary School respectively.  She served as Outreach Secretary at the Law School Fellowship. During her LLB she volunteered at the LDC Legal Aid Clinic.

Career
On 13 September 2020,  Pheona Wall was elected as the new president for Uganda Law Society replacing Simon Peter Kinobe. Pheona Wall won with 441 votes. In March 2016, Pheona was elected Honorary Secretary Uganda Law Society where she worked on governance reforms until 2018 when she was elected vice president and Chairperson of the Legal Aid and Pro Bono Project of the Uganda Law Society. In 2009,  she resigned from NAB and Kampala International University  and joined National Water and Sewarage Cooperation as the head of Public Relations as well as a Legal member of the Contracts Committee of NWSC where she was engaged in loan negotiations, Infrastructure projects and in 2012 December she joined Airtel Uganda as head of public relations and worked  on the Warid Merger, the Cranes Sponsorship,  the Airtel Rising Stars championship and Arsenal Partnership.
She was elected as the Public Relations  Director of the Public Relations Association of Uganda and drafting of the PRAU Bill.
Currently she serves as the  Commercial Officer Legal and Debt Management at National Water and Sewerage Corporation since 2014, as well she is the Chairperson of the Legal Aid and Pro Bono Project of the Uganda Law Society. Pheona has served in two law firms "Tumusiime Kabega and Co Advocates" and "Beyaraza Wagabaza and CO Advocates". 
She has served on different boards such as the Public Relations Association of Uganda, Future Investments Group, East African  Young Water Professionals hence gaining experience in Legal Risk Management, Regulatory Compliance, Infrastructure and Construction Law, Board affairs and Stakeholders relations management.

Honours
In 2018, She won the Hague Institute for Innovation award for Justice  in Law (person to watch 2018) and New Vision under 40 finalist for 2018.

Committee memberships
Pheona Wall is a member of  various organisations such as
Member of Uganda Law Society (currently President to Uganda Law Society)
Member of East African Law Society
Member of Uganda Institute of Corporate Governance
Member of ICT Association of Uganda
Member of Uganda Christian Lawyers' Fraternity
Student Member of the International Chartered Secretaries Association.
Founding Member of the Public Utilities Research Center Academy of Regulatory Professionals (University of Warrington Florida USA)
Member of Public Relations Association of Uganda (Former Director Public Relations)
Founding Member of East Africa Young Water Professionals (Former Director Legal and Communications)

Community work
Pheona served as an administrator for Candlelight Foundation, a NGO in partnership with Icelandic Development Agency to rehabilitate street girls. She has advocated for media rights like the opening up of the Nation Media Group's Kfm Radio and NTV station.

References

External links
Pheona Wall Biography
PROFILE: Who's Pheona Nabasa Wall, aspirant for ULS Presidency? - TND News Uganda
Pheona Wall is the Law Society's president elect

Living people
Makerere University alumni
Year of birth missing (living people)